is a village located in Nagano Prefecture, Japan. , the village had an estimated population of 6,704 in 2156 households, and a population density of 87 persons per km².

Geography
Toyooka is located in the Ina Valley in mountainous southern of Nagano Prefecture. The Tenryū River runs through the village.

Surrounding municipalities
Nagano Prefecture
 IIda
 Matsukawa
 Takamori
 Ōshika
 Takagi

Climate
The town has a climate characterized by hot and humid summers, and cold winters (Köppen climate classification Cfa).  The average annual temperature in Toyooka is 10.4 °C. The average annual rainfall is 1746 mm with September as the wettest month. The temperatures are highest on average in August, at around 22.7 °C, and lowest in January, at around -1.6 °C.

Demographics
Per Japanese census data, the population of Toyooka has decreased gradually over the past 70 years.

History
The area of present-day Toyooka was part of ancient Shinano Province. Ruins from the Japanese Paleolithic, Jomon and Kofun periods indicate continuous settlement for thousands of years. The villages of Kumashiro and Kouno were established on April 1, 1889 with the establishment of the modern municipalities system. The two villages merged on April 1, 1955 to form the village of Toyooka.

Economy
Toyooka is noted for its harvest of matsutake mushrooms.

Education
Toyooka has two public elementary schools and one public middle school operated by the village government. The village does not have a high school.

Transportation

Railway
The village does not have any passenger railway service.

Highway
The village is not located on any national highway.

References

External links
 
Official Website 

 
Villages in Nagano Prefecture